Darrel Anholt (born November 23, 1962) is a Canadian retired professional ice hockey defenceman who played in one National Hockey League game for the Chicago Black Hawks during the 1983–84 NHL season.

See also
List of players who played only one game in the NHL

References

External links

1962 births
Living people
Calgary Wranglers (WHL) players
Canadian ice hockey defencemen
Chicago Blackhawks draft picks
Chicago Blackhawks players
Ice hockey people from Alberta
Milwaukee Admirals (IHL) players
Springfield Indians players